The 1972 Commercial Union Assurance Grand Prix was a professional tennis circuit held that year and organized by the International Lawn Tennis Federation (ILTF). It consisted of 33 Grand Prix tournaments in different categories including three of the four Grand Slam tournaments and was followed by a season-ending Masters tournament. The circuit ran from February through November.

The 1972 Grand Prix circuit ran in competition with the 1972 World Championship Tennis circuit and, to a lesser extent, with the smaller 1972 USLTA Indoor Circuit. Five American indoor tournament in February and March were als part of the USLTA Indoor Circuit. In July 1971 at its annual meeting, the ILTF voted to ban all WCT contract professionals from their tournaments and facilities from the beginning of 1972 onwards. This meant that leading WCT players such as Rod Laver, Ken Rosewall, Arthur Ashe and John Newcombe did not initially have permission to compete in the Grand Prix circuit and Newcombe could not defend his two consecutive Wimbledon titles of 1970 and 1971. In April 1972, however, an agreement was reached between the ILTF and WCT that divided the 1973 tour in a WCT circuit that ran from January through April and a Grand Prix circuit that was scheduled for the rest of the year. Under the agreement the players contracted by the WCT could play in the Grand Prix events as of September 1972. The deal was ratified at the annual ILTF meeting in July.

Schedule

Key

February

March

April

May

June

July

August

September

October

November

* Tournaments combined with a women's Grand Prix tour event.

Points distribution

No points were awarded for first round losers

Standings

Cliff Richey, Roscoe Tanner, Alex Metreveli, Tom Okker and Arthur Ashe played too few Grand Prix tournaments to qualify for prize money.

Grand Prix rankings

List of tournament winners
The list of winners and number of singles titles won, alphabetically by last name:
 Jimmy Connors (6) Roanoke, Queen's Club, Columbus, Cincinnati, Albany, Jacksonville
 John Cooper (1) Hilversum
 Colin Dibley (1) Kitzbühel
 Tom Edlefsen (1) Kansas City
 Andrés Gimeno (3) Los Angeles, French Open, Eastbourne, Gstaad
 Pancho Gonzalez (1) Des Moines
 Bob Hewitt (4) Bournemouth, Bristol, Tanglewood, Indianapolis
 Jan Kodeš (1) Barcelons
 Karl Meiler (1) Buenos Aires
 Alex Metreveli (3) Sydney, Hobart, Adelaide
 Ilie Năstase (11) Baltimore, Omaha, Monte Carlo, Madrid, Nice, Düsseldorf, Montreal, South Orange, Seattle, US Open, London, Masters
 Manuel Orantes (5) Caracas, Rome, Brussels, Hamburg, Båstad
 Cliff Richey (2) London Indoor, Johannesburg
 Stan Smith (7) Salisbury, Hampton, Wimbledon, Washington, D.C., Sacramento, Los Angeles, Paris Bercy, Stockholm
 Roger Taylor (1) Merion

The following players won their first Grand Prix title in 1972:
 Colin Dibley Kitzbühel
 Bob Hewitt Bournemouth

See also

1972 World Championship Tennis circuit
1972 Women's Grand Prix
1972 Virginia Slims Circuit
1972 USLTA Indoor Circuit

Notes

References

External links
 Association of Tennis Professionals (ATP) – 1972 tournament archive
Association of Tennis Professionals (ATP) –  History men's professional tours

Further reading

 
Grand Prix tennis circuit seasons
Grand Prix